The eighth and final season of the long-running Australian outback drama McLeod's Daughters began airing on 23 July 2008 and concluded on 31 January 2009 with a total of 22 episodes.

Plot 
After years as Australia's favourite television drama, the saga of McLeod's Daughters finally came to a close... but not before financial ruin again threatened Drover’s Run. New romances come under pressure, Stevie gives birth, Ingrid disappears  under mysterious circumstances and Jaz McLeod makes a surprise return to Drover’s Run.

Cast

Main 
 Simmone Jade Mackinnon as Stevie Hall
 Abi Tucker as Grace Kingston
 Matthew Passmore as Marcus Turner
 Gillian Alexy as Tayler Geddes
 Luke Jacobz as Patrick Brewer
 Doris Younane as Moira Doyle
Edwina Ritchard as Jaz McLeod (15 episodes)
John Schwarz as Ben Hall (15 episodes)
 Michala Banas as Kate Manfredi (4 episodes)

Recurring 
 Rachael Coopes as Ingrid Marr (21 episodes)
 Peter Hardy as Phil Rakich (20 episodes) 
Gus Murray as Father Dan (16 episodes)
 Martin Lynes as Frank Edwards (8 episodes)
Alex Cook as Lily Edwards (8 episodes)
 Zoe Naylor as Regan McLeod (4 episodes)
 Nicholas Bishop as Russ Connors (3 episodes)

Guest 
 Anita Hegh as Sharon Buckingham (2 episodes)
 Aaron Jeffery as Alex Ryan (2 episodes)
 Alex Davies as Monique Black (2 episodes)
 Rachael Carpani as Jodi Fountain McLeod (1 episode)
 Sonia Todd as Meg Fountain (1 episode)
 Basia A'Hern as Rose Hall Smith (1 episode)
 Tahlia, Brooke & Kaitlyn Stacy-Clark as Charlotte McLeod (1 episode)
 Craig Stott as Jamie Mitchell (1 episode)

Episodes

Reception

Ratings
The eighth season of Mcleod's Daughters suffered drastically in the ratings. On average, it was watched by a mere 633,000 viewers, down 547,000 viewers from the previous season, and an extreme drop compared to earlier seasons. It was the 9th most-watched Australian drama of 2008, and ranked at #29 for its eighth season.

Awards and nominations
The eighth season of McLeod's Daughters received three nominations at the 2009 Logie Awards. It also received one win at the 2009 APRA Awards.

Win
 APRA Award for Best Music for a Television Series or Serial (Alistair Ford – Episode 224)

Nominations
 Gold Logie Award for Most Popular Personality on Australian Television (Simmone Jade Mackinnon)
 Logie Award for Most Popular Actress (Simmone Jade Mackinnon)
 Logie Award for Most Popular Australian Drama Series

Home media

References

 www.tv.com

External links
 McLeod's Daughters Official Website

McLeod's Daughters seasons
2008 Australian television seasons
2009 Australian television seasons